Mimorista subcostalis is a moth in the family Crambidae. It was described by George Hampson in 1913. It is found in North America, where it has been recorded from Arizona, California, Colorado, Nevada, Oklahoma and Texas.

The length of the forewings is 15.5-19.5 mm. Adults are on wing from April to October.

References

Moths described in 1913
Spilomelinae